Gambara, not to be confused with Gambarana, is a town and comune in the province of Brescia, in Lombardy. Bordering communes are Asola (MN), Fiesse, Gottolengo, Isorella, Ostiano (CR), Pralboino, Remedello and Volongo (CR).

Physical geography 
Gambara is bordered by the rivers Mella and Chiese, tributaries of the nearby river Oglio. The town is located on the right side of the Gambara river.

References

Cities and towns in Lombardy